Utricularia mannii is a small, perennial, epiphytic carnivorous plant that belongs to the genus Utricularia and is the only member of Utricularia sect. Chelidon. U. mannii is endemic to tropical Africa, particularly the islands in the Gulf of Guinea (Bioko, São Tomé, and Príncipe) and the adjacent mainland (Cameroon and Nigeria). It has been collected in flower between April and November. It was originally published and described by Daniel Oliver in 1865 and placed in its own section, Chelidon, in 1986 by Peter Taylor.

See also 
 List of Utricularia species

References 

Carnivorous plants of Africa
Epiphytes
Flora of Cameroon
Flora of Equatorial Guinea
Flora of Nigeria
Flora of the Gulf of Guinea islands
mannii
Taxa named by Daniel Oliver